Free ad-supported streaming television, commonly abbreviated FAST, is a category of streaming television services which are available to consumers without a paid subscription, are funded solely by advertising, and stream traditional television programming and studio-produced movies, as distinguished from platforms that largely offer user-generated content such as YouTube and Twitch and from subscription-based ad-supported services like Hulu and Netflix.

FAST services have both linear channels (sometimes referred to as "FAST channels") and video on demand content. The earliest documented use of the term was in a December 2018 article by media analyst Alan Wolk. Wolk came up with the term as a way to differentiate between subscription ad-supported streaming TV services like Hulu and free ad-supported streaming TV services like Pluto TV.

Platforms 
The FAST ecosystem has several layers. The best-known FASTs are the aggregators, which fall into three categories.

 FASTs owned by major media companies: Paramount's Pluto TV, Fox's Tubi, Charter Communications  and Comcast's Xumo, NBCU's Peacock (dropped for new customers only), and ITV’s ITVX service.
 FASTs owned by device manufacturers: Amazon Freevee (previously IMDb TV), The Roku Channel, Samsung TV Plus, LG Channels and Vizio WatchFree+.
 Independent FASTs, such as Plex, and Crackle, which is owned by Chicken Soup for the Soul Entertainment.

These aggregators operate primarily in the United States as of 2022, though some, like Pluto TV, Plex, and Samsung TV Plus operate in additional countries or worldwide.

In addition to aggregator apps, there are FASTs run by a single provider such as E.W. Scripps' Scripps News, PocketWatch and FilmRise that also provide their content for use in linear channels on the aggregator apps.

Content and channels 
Content on FAST services can potentially cover all television genres as well as movies, which are the most popular type of content on the FASTs. Content options can include original and/or archive programming not available through subscription streaming services. Although many linear channels on FAST services resemble cable-style specialty channels, some have an even narrower focus on a single long-running program or media franchise. While some linear FAST channels are exclusive to specific platforms, some, such as Cheddar, are distributed through multiple providers. FASTs owned by major media companies have the advantage of being able to leverage their parent companies extensive libraries.

Variety estimated that 1,455 linear channels were available through major FAST platforms as of June 2022.

References 

Television terminology
Streaming television
Internet broadcasting
New media